3rd Congress may refer to:
3rd Congress of the Philippines (1954–1957)
3rd Congress of the Russian Social Democratic Labour Party (1905)
3rd Congress of the Workers' Party of Korea (1956)
3rd National Congress of the Chinese Communist Party (1923)
3rd National Congress of the Kuomintang (1929)
3rd National Congress of the Lao People's Revolutionary Party (1982)
3rd National People's Congress (1964–1975)
3rd United States Congress (1793–1795)
3rd World Congress of the Comintern (1921)
Brussels Congress (1868), the 3rd Congress of the First International
International Socialist Workers Congress, Zürich 1893, the 3rd Congress of the Second International